The South Inkai mine is a large in-situ leaching mine located in the southern part of Kazakhstan in South Kazakhstan Province. South Inkai represents one of the largest uranium reserves in Kazakhstan having estimated reserves of 135.4 million tonnes of ore grading 0.026% uranium.

References 

Uranium mines in Kazakhstan